Parkway Pantai, Ltd. is a medical company based in Singapore and is Southeast Asia's largest private healthcare provider, and one of the largest in Asia. It is a wholly owned subsidiary of Kuala Lumpur-based IHH Healthcare, whose largest shareholder is Malaysian state investment agency Khazanah Nasional. Parkway Pantai operates private hospitals in Singapore, Brunei, China, Hong Kong, Malaysia, India, Vietnam and the United Arab Emirates. IHH Healthcare also owns the International Medical University. In July 2017, According to the reports, Parkway Pantai issued a US$2 billion multicurrency bond to refinance its debts.

Parkway Pantai
Parkway Pantai owns a network of 21 hospitals, including four private hospitals in Singapore and more than 60 medical centres, clinics, and ancillary healthcare facilities in Singapore, Hong Kong, Malaysia, India and China. It also has a network of regional hospitals in Malaysia, India and Brunei, including Jerudong Park Medical Centre. A number of health-tourism providers work with Parkway Pantai's hospitals to develop medical tourism. It has more than 4,000 licensed beds in aggregate.

The Group's other healthcare network in Singapore includes Parkway Shenton Pte Ltd, one of Singapore's biggest general practices; ParkwayHealth Radiology, a leading radiology service provider; and ParkwayHealth Laboratory, a major provider of laboratory services locally.

Some of Parkway's hospitals are subjected to international healthcare accreditation, while others are not.

Hospitals
Parkway East Hospital
Gleneagles Hospital
Mount Elizabeth Hospital
Mount Elizabeth Novena Hospital
Gleneagles Kuala Lumpur
Gleneagles Penang
Gleneagles Kota Kinabalu
Gleneagles Medini
Gleneagles Hong Kong
Pantai Hospital Ampang
Pantai Hospital Ayer Keroh
Pantai Hospital Batu Pahat
Pantai Hospital Cheras
Pantai Hospital Ipoh
Pantai Hospital Klang
Pantai Hospital Kuala Lumpur
Pantai Hospital Manjung
Pantai Hospital Penang
Pantai Hospital Sungai Petani
Gleneagles JPMC
Gleneagles Global Health City, Chennai
Gleneagles Global Hospitals, Bengaluru
Gleneagles Global Hospitals, Hyderabad
Apollo Gleneagles Hospital
Shanghai International Medical Center

History
On 14 September 2005, Singapore's Parkway Holdings Ltd acquired a 31 per cent stake in Pantai Holdings Bhd for RM312 million (US$82.8 million) to emerge as the largest shareholder of the leading private health-care service provider in Malaysia. Analysts said the move by Parkway, South-east Asia's largest healthcare provider, may spark consolidation in private hospitals in Malaysia. On Tuesday, Parkway purchased 89.7 million shares, for a 22.5 per cent stake, from Pantai's chief executive officer, Datuk Lim Tong Yong, for RM2.45 each at a 50 per cent premium to Pantai's closing price of RM1.63 on Monday, it said in a statement on Tuesday.

Parkway bought an additional 35 million shares, or an 8.8 per cent stake, in the open market for RM1.70 each. The company also purchased 24.3 million warrants from Datuk Lim for RM1.33 apiece, bringing the total to RM311.6 million. Parkway, which is 26 per cent owned by US private equity fund Newbridge Capital, said there will be potential operational synergies with its existing two Malaysian hospitals and other hospitals in the region. With the deal, Parkway would control Pantai's seven hospitals and about 1,000 beds.

An analyst from Nomura Advisory Services told The Business Times that the entry of Parkway, an established health-care provider with a proven track record, would substantially boost Pantai's performance. "There are not many players within Malaysia. Given Parkways entry, it should facilitate those who want to sell," the analyst said. JP Morgan's research head Melvyn Boey told the paper: "Most important (about the purchase) is that Parkway is very experienced in the healthcare industry and the whole consolidation exercise will help the industry." The entry of Parkway, the owner of the Gleneagles group of hospitals, could alert other private hospitals that there is a ready buyer in town.

Parkway Holdings Limited began operating as a subsidiary of Parkway Pantai Limited in August 2010.

References

External links

Official website of Parkway Pantai

Health care companies of Singapore
Singaporean brands
IHH Healthcare
Companies listed on the Singapore Exchange